Polarstern Canyon is an undersea canyon named for the German research vessel Polarstern, which took part in 22 expeditions to the Arctic and Antarctic (1982–1995). Name proposed by Dr. Heinrich Hinze, Alfred Wegener Institute for Polar and Marine Research, Bremerhaven, Germany. Name approved 6/97 (ACUF 271).

References

External links

Canyons and gorges of Antarctica
Landforms of Coats Land